The Georgia women's national football team represents Georgia in international football. Georgia took part in the world cup qualification group 7 for the 1999 FIFA Women's World Cup, but withdrew after two matches, against Yugoslavia (0–11) and Turkey (0–1). After this, Georgia did not take part in qualification until the European Championships in 2009. Then, Georgia were placed in a group with Turkey, Northern Ireland and Croatia. Georgia finished last, with no points.

Georgia won their first match on 11 May 2009, winning 3–1 against Macedonia, and also scoring their first goal in a competitive game that year, in a 1–3 defeat to Scotland in the qualification for the 2011 World Cup. However, they also set a new negative record that year; the qualification opened with a 0–15 defeat to Denmark. In the subsequent qualifiers for the 2013 European Championship and 2015 World Cup the team couldn't make it past the preliminary round, ranking third of four teams in both occasions.

Results and fixtures

The following is a list of match results in the last 12 months, as well as any future matches that have been scheduled.

2022

Georgia Results and Fixtures – Soccerway.com

Coaching staff

Current coaching staff

Manager history

Teimuraz Svanadze (20??–)

Players

Current squad
The following players were called up for an away match against Slovakia on 26 October 2021.

Caps and goals accurate up to and including 7 July 2021.

Recent call-ups
The following players have been called up to the squad in the past 12 months.

Records

*Active players in bold, statistics correct as of 6 September 2021.

Most capped players

Top goalscorers

Competitive record

FIFA Women's World Cup

*Draws include knockout matches decided on penalty kicks.

Group A

UEFA Women's Championship

*Draws include knockout matches decided on penalty kicks.

Honours

Notes

See also

Sport in Georgia
Football in Georgia
Women's football in Georgia (country)|Women's football in Georgia
Georgia women's national under-20 football team
Georgia women's national under-17 football team
Georgia men's national football team

References

External links
Official website
FIFA profile

 
European women's national association football teams